Crumbling is the second studio album by South Korean folktronica artist Mid-Air Thief. It was released on July 31, 2018. The album features vocals by South Korean indie singer-songwriter Summer Soul. It was nominated at the Korean Music Awards in 2019 in the categories "Album of the Year" and "Best Dance & Electronic Album" and won the latter.

Background 
The album gained attention from online music communities like RateYourMusic, where it is currently ranked 5th on the user-determined list of the best albums of 2018.

Release
Crumbling was released independently in South Korea on July 31, 2018 and in United States on August 7, 2018. It was released in Japan on December 4, 2018 by Botanical House. The album was reissued on September 20, 2019 by Topshelf Records.

Critical reception
Weiv described Crumbling as "the power of faint sounds." Reggie MT of Tiny Mix Tapes declared that the album is "much like its spiritual predecessor, alternately chillaxed and maximalist, calming and rousing." It ranked on Pretty Much Amazing's 2018: Year in Review list at number 22, while the writer stated that "at first listen, Mid-Air Thief sounds like a Grizzly Bear clone, but upon further listening, this is pacific island pop you didn't know you wanted."

Track listing
All lyrics written by Mid-Air Thief and Summer Soul; all music written by Mid-Air Thief.

Personnel
Credits adapted from the liner notes of Crumbling.

Musicians
 Mid-Air Thief – instruments, music
 Summer Soul – backing vocals
 Ko Jae-Hyun – instruments

Artwork
 Shin Hye-Jung – artwork

References

2018 albums
Mid-Air Thief albums
Korean-language albums